Tikhy Klyuch is a rural locality (a village) in Ishlinsky Selsoviet, Beloretsky District, Bashkortostan, Russia. The population was 20 as of 2010. There is 1 street.

Geography 
Tikhy Klyuch is located 49 km west of Beloretsk (the district's administrative centre) by road. Kartaly is the nearest rural locality.

References 

Rural localities in Beloretsky District